Palenque was a Maya city state in southern Mexico that flourished in the 7th century.

Palenque may also refer to:

Places
 Palenque or quilombo, a type of Brazilian village founded by escaped slaves
 Palenque, Chiapas, the modern town and municipality in Mexico
 Palenque, Colón, a town in Panama
 Palenque, the capital of Yateras, Cuba
 Palenque Canton, a canton of Ecuador
 Isla Palenque, an island of Panama, off the western Pacific shoreline 
 San Basilio de Palenque, a Colombian town
 Sabana Grande de Palenque, a municipality in San Cristóbal province, Dominican Republic

Other uses
 Palenque International Airport, Palenque, Chiapas, Mexico
 Palenque language (or Palenquero), a Spanish-based creole language spoken in parts of coastal Colombia
 Palenque River, Ecuador
 an arena or cockpit in cockfighting
 Concerts during Carnival in Jalisco, notably Jalostotitlán, Mexico
 Palenque, a traditional factory to produce the alcoholic drink mezcal

See also
 
 Palengke, a type of public market common throughout the Philippines